"Songs of Youth and Discovery" is a five-part song cycle written by composer Jerrold Fisher and lyrics by Lawrence Leritz.  The cycle had its beginnings with the "Dance Celebration" company which premiered in New York City at the Priory Theatre, with the number "Worth A Song" a standout.  "Worth A Song" was later performed in Paris, with Lawrence Leritz, dancer, Elaine Bunse, soprano and New York City Opera's Bruce Norris, pianist.  In 2007, four more songs were added and the song cycle was formed.   On June 3, 2007, the world premiere concert of the "Songs Of Youth And Discovery" debuted at the historic Sherman Cymru formally the Sherman Theatre in Shroudsburg, PA. by the Pocono Choral Society.

Songs

On Leaving
And
Sing!
I Ache With Pain
Worth A Song!

References

ASCAP Playback- "Stepping Out"-Premiered:  http://www.ascap.com/playback/2007/summer/stepping_out/premiered.html
Broadwayworld.com: "Coming Up This Week in Theatre - 5/27/2008"   http://broadwayworld.com/article/Coming_Up_This_Week_in_Theatre_5272008_20080527
Pocono Choral Society: https://web.archive.org/web/20070605220059/http://www.poconochoralsociety.org/Concert%20Schedule2006-7.htm
Waiting In The Wings: "The Pocono Choral Society Presents "Music For a New Century"-http://waitinginthewings.net/2007/05/01/the-pocono-choral-society-presents-music-for-a-new-century/#more-191

Song cycles